Sören Storks (born 9 November 1988) is a German football referee who is based in Velen. He referees for VfL Ramsdorf of the Westphalian Football and Athletics Association.

Refereeing career
Storks, referee of the club VfL Ramsdorf, has officiated on the DFB level since 2013. He began officiating in the 3. Liga for the 2012–13 season, refereeing his first match between Rot-Weiß Erfurt and VfB Stuttgart II on 7 August 2012. After three years, Jablonski was nominated as referee for the 2015–16 season of the 2. Bundesliga, refereeing his first match between FSV Frankfurt and FC St. Pauli on 30 August 2015. In 2017, Storks was one of four referees promoted to officiate in the Bundesliga for the 2017–18 season.

Personal life
Storks lives in Velen, where he works as a carpenter.

References

External links
 Profile at DFB.de 
 Profile at WorldFootball.net

1988 births
Living people
German football referees